Oleksandr Hrebieniuk (born in Horishni Plavni, June 6, 1981) is a retired Soviet football player.

Career
Oleksandr Hrebieniuk, started his career in Hirnyk-Sport Horishni Plavni. In 1999 he played for FC Vorskla-2 Poltava and Vorskla Poltava and Hirnyk-Sport Horishni Plavni. From 2000 until 2002 he played for Kryvbas Kryvyi Rih and Kryvbas-2 Kryvyi Rih. In 2003 he moved to Spartak Sumyk and in 2004, he played for Mykolaiv. In 2005 he moved for three seasons to Oleksandriya and it was the most successful was the period of performances as a part of Oleksandriya, where Grebinyuk played 103 matches and scored 28 goals. He made his debut for Oleksandriya on April 7, 2005 in the home match of the 13th round of Group B of the second league of the Ukrainian Championship against Olkom from Melitopol. The match ended in a draw, Alexander was in the starting lineup in that match, but in the 46th minute of the match he was replaced by Maxim Kundel. On May 2, 2005, he scored his first goal for the club in the victory the victorious match against Ovidiopolsky Dnistra of the 19th round of the Group of B of Ukrainian Second League in the season 2005–06. In that match, PFC "Oleksandriya" was able to win with a 2: 0 rakhunk, except for the goal Oleksandr was identified in that match with a card (for 58 minutes)  He got promoted to Ukrainian First League, after the season 2005–06 and become to the top scorer in group B with 16 goals.

Desna Chernihiv
After that, in 2008 he joined Desna Chernihiv  the club in the city of Chernihiv for one season where he played 29 games and he scored 4 goals.

Mash'al Mubarek
In the summer of 2009 he went abroad, defending the colors of the Uzbek Mash'al Mubarek, where he played 27 matches and scored 3 goals. In the summer of 2010 he returned to Ukraine signed a contract with Lviv.

Desna Chernihiv
In 2011–2012 season started in Desna Chernihiv, but has been defending Nyva Ternopil's colors since September. Oleksandr's last professional club was Karlivka, the colors of which he defended in the summer-autumn part of the 2012/13 season.

After that he played in the amateur teams of FC Globyne (Globyne) in 2013-2014 and FC Rokyta (Rokyta village) in 2015.

References

Honours
Oleksandriya
 Ukrainian Second League: 2005–06

Individual
 Top Scorer Ukrainian Second League: 2005–06 (16 goals)

External links 
 Profile on Official website of Ukrainian Second League 
 Profile on footballfacts.ru 
 
 FCdesna.com.ua

1981 births
Living people
People from Horishni Plavni
Ukrainian footballers
Soviet footballers
FC Desna Chernihiv players
FC Hirnyk-Sport Horishni Plavni players
FC Vorskla Poltava players
FC Vorskla-2 Poltava players
FC Kryvbas Kryvyi Rih players
FC Kryvbas-2 Kryvyi Rih players
FC Spartak Sumy players
MFC Mykolaiv players
FC Oleksandriya players
FK Mash'al Mubarek players
FC Lviv players
FC Nyva Ternopil players
FC Karlivka players
Association football midfielders
Sportspeople from Poltava Oblast
Association football forwards